Munda is the largest settlement on the island of New Georgia in the Western Province of Solomon Islands, and consists of a number of villages. It is located at the southwestern tip (called Munda Point) of the western end of New Georgia, and the large Roviana Lagoon is just offshore.

History
Munda Point was originally the site of a coconut plantation established by Englishman Norman Wheatley, and then owned by Australian Lesley Gill.

The Methodist Mission in the Western Province was established by Rev. John Frances Goldie in 1902. He dominated the mission and gained the loyalty of Solomon Islander members of his church. The relationship with the colonial administrators of the  British Solomon Island Protectorate were also fraught with difficulty, at this time due to Goldie's effective control over the Western Solomon Islands. From 1927 to 1934 Dr Edward Sayers worked at the Methodist mission where he established a hospital at Munda and also at Gizo and Vella Lavella, and carried out fieldwork in the treatment of malaria.

In November 1942, during World War II, the town became strategically important after Japanese forces built an airstrip (on the site of today's Munda Airport) to support Japanese forces fighting the Battle of Guadalcanal. A Japanese convoy put into Munda Point on 24 November 1942, and started construction under careful concealment from the air by means of rows of coconut palms suspended by cable. The airstrip was discovered by American planes on 3 December, and the first airstrikes were delivered by B-17 Flying Fortress bombers on 9 December. However, the Japanese were able to use Munda despite regular bombardment from both air and sea, and the Allies launched Operation Cartwheel in order to drive the Japanese out of the Solomons and ultimately eliminate the large Japanese base at Rabaul. The New Georgia Campaign was launched in late June, 1943 when mainly American but also Pacific Islander troops conducted the Landings on Rendova and several other amphibious operations throughout the New Georgia Group. 
The Allied forces spent July 1943 conducting the Drive on Munda Point, shelling and bombing Japanese forces in and around Munda Airfield, fighting off a large Japanese counterattack, and eventually closing in on Munda overland, capturing it on 4–5 August during the Battle of Munda Point. The heavy fighting left thousands dead on both sides and many more wounded.

Transport
Boats are the main method of coastal and inter-island transport. 
 
The airstrip from World War II was later converted into Munda Airport and is used commercially for daily flights land from Honiara, Setghe and Gizo, including services on Solomon Airlines.

Geography
Lambete, the largest village in Munda, today consists of a number of shops, a branch of the Bank of South Pacific (BSP), a post office, a telecommunications centre, a bakery, accommodations, the airstrip and a small port.

Climate

See also 
 Kasi Maru

References

Populated places in the Solomon Islands
Western Province (Solomon Islands)